

Central characters
Firebird Angelo: Netaian noble, officer, and wastling
Brennen Caldwell: telepath, Federate officer, Firebird's husband
Great Speaker/Majestic Singer: God of the Ehretan people

Major characters

Federate
Ellet Kinsman: telepath, Federate officer, romantic rival of Firebird

Netaian
Carradee Angelo: eldest sister of Firebird
Muirnen Rogonin: Duke of Claighbro, political opportunist
Phoena Angelo: sister of Firebird, and her antagonist
Tel Tellai: husband of Phoena, eventual ally of Firebird

Shuhr
Dru Polar: highly powerful telepath and Testing Director
Eshdeth Shirak: Eldest of the Shuhr, killed by Firebird and Brennen in Fusion Fire
Juddis Adiyn: lead geneticist, responsible for the eugenics program
Micahel Shirak: son of Modabah
Modabah Shirak: Eldest of the Shuhr after death of his father Eshdeth
Terza Shirak: minor genetic technician

Minor characters

Federate

Non-Sentinel
Lee Danton: Netaia's governor during Federate occupation

Sentinel
Aldana Spieth: master telepath specializing in medicine
Asea Caldwell: wife of Tarance, assassinated in Fusion Fire
Brit Caldwell: son of Tarance and Asea, assassinated in Fusion Fire
Damalcon Dardy: Federate officer, friend of Brennen
Destia Caldwell: daughter of Tarance and Asea, assassinated in Fusion Fire
Kether Caldwell: son of Tarance and Asea, assassinated in Fusion Fire
Kiel Caldwell: son of Firebird and Brennen
Kinnor Caldwell: son of Firebird and Brennen
Shelevah Mattason: Federate weapons instructor who poses as Firebird's bodyguard in Crown of Fire
Tarance Caldwell: doctor, estranged brother of Brennen, assassinated by Shuhr agents in Fusion Fire
Uri Harris: Federate interrogation specialist who poses as Brennen's bodyguard in Crown of Fire

Netaian
Corey Bowman: Firebird's friend and fellow wastling, killed in the attack on Veroh in Firebird
Daithi Drake-Angelo: Carradee's prince-consort
Iarla Angelo: queen of Netaia after Carradee's abdication 
Kelling Friel: captain of the redjackets (Electoral Police)
Liach Stele: wastling who was executed for incorrigible behavior
Siwann Angelo: queen of Netaia; mother of Carradee, Phoena, and Firebird; committed suicide after the failed Veroh expedition

Shuhr
Cassia Talumah: killed by Firebird and Brennen in Fusion Fire

 
Lists of fictional characters